The following is a list of characters, their plot lines and their performers in the Terminator film franchise consisting of six films. A list specific to the characters, their plot lines and their performers as presented in the television series Terminator: The Sarah Connor Chronicles can be found at List of Terminator: The Sarah Connor Chronicles characters; including supporting characters, and important villains.

Overview

Family tree

B

Kate Brewster
Katherine "Kate" Connor (née Brewster) is a fictional character from the Terminator films. She is the wife of John Connor and his future second-in-command. She is portrayed by Claire Danes in Terminator 3: Rise of the Machines, and Bryce Dallas Howard in Terminator Salvation. Danes had previously been asked about returning for another film, and responded, "I don't think so. I felt sort of kidnapped by the production." Charlotte Gainsbourg was originally intended to take on the role of Kate after Danes left, but due to scheduling conflicts, she was unable.

Kate grew up before the war. Her father, USAF Lieutenant General Robert Brewster, is the program director for Cyber Research Systems (CRS) and is overseeing development of Skynet. In Terminator 3, she is a veterinarian and is engaged to Scott Mason; however, she is hesitant of marrying him. In the film, it is stated that just prior to the events of Terminator 2, she had a teenage makeout session with John Connor that might have led to a relationship, had the events of T2 not occurred. Scott is killed by a Terminator known as the T-X, and Kate evades it with the help of John and a reprogrammed T-101. The trio set off to CRS to stop her father from activating Skynet, but they arrive too late, and Robert is killed by the T-X. Kate and John reach a hardened fallout shelter in the Sierra Nevada mountains and are able to survive Judgment Day. They use communications equipment within the facility to contact survivors and start a Resistance force.

It is stated by the T-101 that Kate's future self was the one who sent it back, after the machine killed John prior to it being captured and reprogrammed by her.

In Terminator Salvation, set in 2018, Kate is John's wife and is pregnant with his child. She is also a physician within John's unit, and later leads a rescue squad for him and others.

Robert Brewster
Lieutenant General Robert Brewster, portrayed by David Andrews in Terminator 3: Rise of the Machines, is Kate's father who is also the program director at Cyber Research Systems (CRS). He is supervising the development of digital defense systems for the United States military, including Skynet. Brewster is hesitant to activate Skynet, as it would have unprecedented control over the country's unmanned defenses, including nuclear missiles. When a computer virus spreads around the world, Brewster is pressured by the Joint Chiefs of Staff to activate Skynet so it can destroy the virus, unaware that Skynet itself is it. Upon activating Skynet, Brewster is mortally wounded by the T-X to prevent him from interfering with the A.I.'s takeover. He entrusts John to take care of Kate.

C

John Connor

Sarah Connor

D

Danny Dyson
Danny Dyson is the son of Miles and Tarissa Dyson, and appears as a child in Terminator 2: Judgment Day, played by DeVaughn Nixon, and an adult in Terminator Genisys, played by Dayo Okeniyi. In Terminator 2, after Sarah Connor attacks the Dysons in an attempt to kill Miles and stop him from creating Skynet, Danny shields his father and begs Sarah not to kill him. After Sarah relents out of guilt and the Terminator reveals the truth to Miles and Tarissa, John takes Danny to his room for his safety.

In Terminator Genisys, where the timeline has been altered by Skynet since the events of 1973, by the year 2017, Danny has become the president of Cyberdyne Systems and is heading the creation of Genisys, which is a disguised Skynet, with help from both John Connor, who has actually been turned by Skynet into the T-3000 and sent to the past to ensure Skynet's rise while the Dysons remain unaware of the coming threat.

Miles Dyson

G

Ginger
Ginger (portrayed by Bess Motta) was Sarah Connor's roommate and best friend in 1984. She is an avid fan of music and could frequently be seen carrying a walkman. She, along with her boyfriend Matt were killed by the T-800 when it came to Sarah's apartment looking for her.

The character of Ginger was originally written as an Areobics Instructor, which in turn, was an occupation of Motta's at the time. A Gym scene depicting Ginger as an instructor was present in the original script, but was never filmed.

H

Grace Harper
Grace Harper, portrayed by Mackenzie Davis, is part of a security detail for her adoptive mother, Daniella Ramos, the leader of the future resistance against the machines in an alternate future where Skynet was erased from existence but replaced with another rogue A.I., Legion. After being severely wounded by a Rev-7, Grace volunteers to become an augmented soldier by technology (similar to Marcus Wright from Terminator Salvation), granting her limited levels of enhanced strength and speed and an ability to sense Legion's machines at proximity. Later, after the machines are defeated, she is sent back in time to protect a younger Dani from Legion's Rev-9. After locating Dani, she joins forces with an aging Sarah Connor and a T-800, named Carl, to counter and destroy the Rev-9, and, in the process, learns about John Connor and Skynet, that the timeline had altered before because of Sarah and Carl's respective actions. Initially fearing Carl because of him being a Terminator, Grace comes to trust Carl after learning he is not related to Legion and his efforts to make amends to Sarah. At first, Grace conceals Dani's true significance from her, leading Sarah to believe that Dani is destined to give birth to the leader of the resistance as she did to John, but Grace eventually reveals the truth, telling her that she is not the "mother of some man" destined to save the future. In the climactic battle against the Rev-9 in a power plant, Grace (already mortally wounded after being stabbed by the Rev-9) insists that Dani and Carl use her power source as an EMP to destroy the rogue machine before she dies.

M

Scott Mason
Scott Mason, portrayed by Mark Famiglietti, was the fiance of Kate Brewster. She was in a dedicated relationship with Scott and had been blowing off her father's attempts to visit her in favor of focusing on their eventual wedding. One night when Kate is notified of a disturbance at the clinic, she tells Scott to go back to sleep and that she'll be back before he wakes up. While she's out, the T-X breaks into their Apartment and kills Scott as he awakes. Assuming his identity, it tags along with two detectives who are in a search for Kate and kills them immediately upon hearing her location. The T-X locates Kate as Scott and disinigrates his form in front of her before attempting to kill her, much to her horror. After the Terminator informs her that her fiance is dead, Kate mourns Scott, taking the blame for his death, but John attempts to console her by saying it was not her fault.

Scott's last name was originally intended to be Peterson, but after the 2002 murder of Laci Peterson and her unborn son Connor committed by Scott Peterson, the character's last name was changed to Mason and a line of dialouge was altered. Despite the final film referring to the character as "Scott Mason", the end credits still list Famgiletti's role as "Scott Peterson".

O

O'Brien
O'Brien, portrayed by J. K. Simmons (Old) and Wayne Bastrup (Young) in Terminator Genisys, is a police detective with the San Francisco Police Department who investigates time travelers, especially Terminators, correctly suspects that there is a conspiracy orchestrated by killer machines from the future and seeks to learn it. It is implied by actions that, since his youth, O'Brien is intrigued with the impossibilities and mysteries. While on patrol as a rookie officer in 1984 at Los Angeles, he and his partner Gerber encounter and arrest Kyle Reese as he arrives from an erased future timeline. Gerber is killed by the T-1000, which O'Brien witnesses, leading him to become the only one who believes Reese and Sarah Connor about Terminators. Thirty-three years later, when Reese and Sarah travel to 2017, an older O'Brien recognizes them on the news and speaks up for them in the hospital. Though Reese recognizes him, O'Brien's superiors refuse to listen. After they are arrested once again while fleeing from John Connor, who has since been transformed into the T-3000, O'Brien is shot in the shoulder when John infiltrates the station, but frees Sarah and Reese, returns their weapons to them and helps them escape in a police helicopter so that they can stop the Skynet-precursor, Genisys, from going online and starting Judgment Day.

R

Dani Ramos
Daniella Ramos, commonly known as Dani and portrayed by Natalia Reyes, is the main protagonist of Terminator: Dark Fate. She is an automobile assembly plant worker from Mexico City and the future leader of the resistance against the machines in a timeline where Skynet was erased from existence, but John Connor was killed and Judgment Day was started by a different rogue A.I. called Legion. In the present, Dani is targeted for termination by Legion's Rev-9, while her adoptive daughter from the future, Grace, is sent back to protect her, having been turned into a technological-augmented super-soldier. After her father and brother are killed, Dani goes on the run with Grace, and they are saved by Sarah Connor, who initially believes that Dani's unborn son is the destined leader of the human resistance against Legion. After Dani, Grace and Sarah are led to the T-800, Carl, who previously killed John Connor, Dani decides to take a more active role in defending herself to avenge her slain family, and despite her small physique, very quickly masters heavy weapons training under Sarah, Grace, and Carl. Dani offers her friendship to Carl, knowing that this Terminator can experience remorse over its past and love for its adoptive family allows her to trust it. In the film's climactic battle, Dani attempts to distract the Rev-9 to allow her allies to force it into a spinning turbine which damages it severely. Having already mortally stabbed by the Rev-9 and dying, Grace insists that Dani use her power core as an EMP against the machine; Carl ultimately saves Dani by sacrificing himself to use the EMP to destroy the Rev-9, killing them both. Aware that the threat of the machines is not over, Dani allows Sarah to train her for the battles ahead. With this knowledge, in the future, Dani will send Grace back to protect her younger self from the Rev-9 and tattoo the coordinates of Carl's location on Grace.

Diego Ramos
Diego Ramos, portrayed by Diego Boneta, is the older brother of Daniella Ramos and her co-worker at the assembly plant. In the film, Diego is replaced by a drone and fired from his job without notice. When Dani goes to rebuke their supervisor about this, they are attacked by the Rev-9, disguised as their father, Vicente. They are saved by Grace, who has been sent from the future to protect Dani, but in the ensuing car chase, Diego is impaled by a piece of rebar by the Rev-9. After begging Grace to keep Dani safe no matter what (similar to Traxler in the first film), he is killed when the Rev-9 crashes into the car, causing an explosion.

Vicente Ramos
Vicente Ramos, portrayed by Enrique Arce, is the father of Daniella and Diego Ramos. He is the Rev-9's first victim, who kills and impersonates him in his mission to find and kill Daniella at her workplace. The Rev-9 appears at their home asking if Daniella is in, claiming to be her friend, but Vicente points out that all of Daniella's friends call her "Dani". The knowledge of this nickname and the guise of Dani's father enables the Rev-9 to gain her trust and nearly kill her before Grace intervenes.

Kyle Reese

Rev-9

S

Enrique Salceda
Enrique Salceda, played by Castulo Guerra in Terminator 2, is a Guatamelan friend of Sarah Connor. After Sarah is rescued from Pescadero by the T-101 and John, she directs them to Salceda, who has kept a secret cache of heavy weaponry and supplies for her to fight against Skynet's Terminators. After they stock up on weapons to prepare themselves against the T-1000, Sarah advises Salceda to take his family and go into hiding after sunset, since the T-1000 or the authorities will likely come to his home for the Connors. Following a nightmare about Judgment Day, however, Sarah leaves without John and the T-101 in order to assassinate Miles Dyson before he can accidentally create Skynet.

Peter Silberman, Ph.D.
Dr. Peter Silberman was a criminal psychologist who worked for the state of California and with the Los Angeles Police Department. Silberman thought nothing of the so-called delusions shared by Kyle Reese and Sarah Connor other than being able to make a career from them being under his care. After a close call to seeing the Terminator in 1984, Silberman witnessed two in action in 1995 during Sarah Connor's escape from the Pescadero State Hospital.

He was portrayed by Earl Boen in the first three Terminator films, the only actor to appear in the first three films, aside from Schwarzenegger.

The Terminator: Dr. Silberman was brought in to question Kyle Reese, the soldier sent from the future to protect Sarah Connor from the Terminator that tried to kill her. He downplayed Reese's story as delusional and constructed in such a way that it cannot be refuted, such as how there was no evidence of advanced technology because the time machine can only send things back that generate a bio-energy created by living tissue, and seemed far more interested in using Reese to build his own career than uncovering the truth despite Reese's claims about the other two Sarah Connors who had been killed earlier that same day. He left the police station before the Terminator's attack, briefly passing him in the corridor.

Terminator 2: Judgment Day: Silberman was the chief and criminal psychologist at Pescadero State Hospital where Sarah Connor was imprisoned as a mentally unsound inmate. Having somehow not heard about the first Terminator's attack on the police station, Silberman made little headway with Sarah, and was constantly a victim of her attacks when the opportunity presented itself, even stabbing him in the knee at one point. Sarah briefly used him as a hostage when she threatened to inject him with poison to try to get out of the asylum, by forcing his staff to release her. He was left stunned when he briefly witnessed the T-800 and T-1000 Terminators as Sarah attempted her escape, particularly after seeing the T-1000 morph through a barred door.

Terminator 3: Rise of the Machines: Silberman resigned from Pescadero and became a post-trauma counsellor. He made a brief appearance when he tried to comfort Kate Brewster, following her encounter with the T-800 which was protecting her and John from the T-X. He shared his experience of being taken hostage by Sarah with Kate and tried to assure her that she was imagining things after she saw the T-800 unaffected by a bullet, though he himself appeared to doubt his own claims, implying that he still remembered the T-1000. He fled after seeing the T-800 for himself and recognizing it as a Terminator. In the initial draft of the script, Silberman was meant to die during Skynet's attack on humanity, fulfilling Sarah's prediction that he will die after Judgment Day.

Archive audio of Boen as Silberman from Terminator 2 is heard in the opening scene of Terminator: Dark Fate.

Star
Star, played by Jadagrace in Terminator Salvation, is an 8-year-old mute companion of Kyle Reese following Judgment Day. Harboring an ability to sense when Terminators are approaching, she and Reese encounter human/machine hybrid Marcus Wright in Los Angeles and attempt to locate John Connor, but she and Reese are captured by Terminators and taken to the San Francisco base where Reese is to be killed to prevent him from travelling in time to 1984 to protect Sarah Connor and conceive John with her. She and Reese escape with help from John and Marcus, though John is mortally wounded by a T-800 which is killed by Marcus. At a field hospital, after Marcus offers to give up his heart to save John, Star holds Marcus's hand for the first and last time, indicating that she has come to trust him.

T

Terminator

T-1000

T-3000

Ed Traxler
Ed Traxler, portrayed by Paul Winfield, is a lieutenant officer at the Los Angeles Police Department in 1984. He, along with his partner Vukovich, are the primary investigators in the Phone Book Killer case, in which two women named Sarah Connor are murdered in their homes. They help out Sarah Connor when she reports that she is being stalked, and Traxler advises her to stay in a public place until they arrive to pick her up. The perpetrator, a T-800 Terminator, attacks Sarah but she is rescued by Kyle Reese. In the ensuing chase, the Terminator crashes while the police arrest Reese, believing him to be the killer. Traxler and Vukovich observe Reese talking with Dr. Silberman and explaining that the Terminator was sent from the future to kill Sarah before the birth of her son, John, but was not sure which woman was its target so it decided to go for all three Sarah Connors in Los Angeles. Though Traxler becomes concerned, he tries to pacify Sarah by claiming that the Terminator is most likely an ordinary man on anasthetic drugs and wearing body armor, and arranges for her mother to pick her up. When the Terminator attacks the police station, however, Traxler attempts to gun down the cyborg with a machine gun, but the Terminator is unfazed and returns fire, mortally wounding Traxler.

A deleted scene shows Traxler still alive after being shot but slowly dying. As Sarah and Reese are fleeing the station, Traxler begs Reese to keep Sarah alive no matter what and hands him his revolver, showing that he now believes his future stories. Sarah holds Traxler's hand for a second before they leave.

V

Janelle Voight
Janelle Voight, portrayed by Jenette Goldstein, is John Connor's foster mother in Terminator 2. In the film, she appears to have a strained relationship with John, who refuses to acknowledge her as a mother figure. She and her husband Todd direct both the T-800 and the T-1000 on their searches for John, unaware of who they really are. Later, the T-1000 returns to their home and kills Janelle first in order to impersonate her and lure John back to the house, but the T-800 sees through its ruse and hangs the phone up. Though Janelle's death is not shown, a deleted scene shows the T-1000 walk past the bathroom where her legs are seen, implying that it killed her while she was in the shower. In Terminator: The Sarah Connor Chronicles, John admits his regret for the Voights' deaths and that they wanted to adopt him to raise him in a better home.

Todd Voight
Todd Voight, portrayed by Xander Berkeley, is John Connor's foster father in Terminator 2. Like his wife, he does not seem to get on well with John, who addresses him by his first name. Like Janelle, he is killed by the T-1000 when he accidentally exposes it by shouting at the family dog, Max, to stop barking, as Max had detected a Terminator on the premises. The T-1000 kills him by impaling him through the mouth.

Vukovich
Detective Vukovich, portrayed by Lance Henriksen, is Lieutenant Ed Traxler's main partner in The Terminator. Along with Traxler, he investigates the first T-800's murders of two Sarah Connors, and manages to reach the actual Sarah it is targeting along with Kyle Reese, who was sent back in time to protect her from the T-800. As Reese is being questioned by Dr. Silberman, Vukovich is obviously amused by Silberman's slightly taunting remarks, while Traxler appears concerned. When the T-800 eventually does attack the police station to find Sarah, the police fight back and attempt to gun the cyborg down. After seeing Traxler mortally wounded, Vukovich tries to kill the T-800, who is unfazed and merely returns fire, killing Vukovich.

Vukovich was originally planned to return in Terminator 3: Rise of the Machines, having survived but bound to a wheelchair and now investigating the Terminators' activities, but he was cut from the script. Henriksen was also briefly considered to play the Terminator in the first film before Arnold Schwarzenegger was cast.

W

Blair Williams
Blair Williams, portrayed by Moon Bloodgood in Terminator Salvation, is a resistance fighter pilot serving in John Connor's Tech-Com unit. After Marcus Wright, Kyle Reese, Star and human refugees are attacked by Terminators in Los Angeles, Blair is one of the pilots sent by John to intercept the Terminators and save the humans, but she is shot down by a Hunter Killer. She is later found and rescued by Marcus and they make their way to find John on foot, forming a close bond in the process when they are forced to fight off a group of human bandits. When they reach John's base, however, Marcus steps on a magnetic landmine, severely injuring him and exposing his metal endoskeleton. John, believing Marcus was sent to kill him, orders him killed, but Blair defies John and frees Marcus, though she is shot in the leg in the process. John orders Blair freed and treated medically before he leaves to help Marcus free Reese and the hostages from the Skynet base in San Francisco. Following the battle, in which John is mortally wounded, Marcus offers to give his heart up to save his life. Blair, who by now has fallen in love with Marcus, begs him to reconsider, but Marcus, who had previously caused his brother's death by accident, sees it as his redemption. Blair kisses Marcus for the first and last time, and watches the operation that takes Marcus's life.

Marcus Wright
Marcus Wright, portrayed by Sam Worthington, is a major character in Terminator Salvation. As a death row inmate in 2003, he donates his body to Cyberdyne Systems for medical research, prior to be executed for accidentally causing his brother's death. Marcus is turned into a cyborg and awakens in 2018 in the ruins of Los Angeles, where he encounters Kyle Reese and his mute companion, Star. On their way to find John Connor, Reese and Star are captured by Skynet's machines. Marcus gives pursuit, in the process meeting up with Blair Williams, a downed pilot, with whom he bonds. At the resistance base, Marcus is caught in an explosion and his metal endoskeleton is revealed. John takes him prisoner, believing that Marcus was sent from the future to kill either him or Reese, but Marcus informs him that Reese is being held prisoner in Skynet's San Francisco base. Though John orders Marcus killed, Blair secretly frees him, and he and John make a plan to rescue Reese together. At the Skynet base, Marcus encounters Skynet itself on a screen and learns that he was actually resurrected as a cyborg to lure John to the base where he would be killed. Marcus rebels against Skynet and decides to aid John in rescuing Reese and the human prisoners and fighting a T-800. Though John's heart is badly wounded in the ensuing battle, Marcus destroys the T-800 by tearing its head off, and they flee the base before destroying it with explosives. At a field hospital, Marcus offers his heart for transplantation, saving John's life, and bids his friends goodbye, kissing Blair for the first and last time.

As Terminator Genisys serves as a reboot of the franchise, the events of Salvation are ignored and Kyle Reese is depicted as being rescued and taken in as a child directly by John Connor, and his interactions with Marcus and Star are absent.

X

T-X

References

Lists of film characters